DC Universe was an American subscription video-on-demand (SVOD) and digital comics service operated by DC Entertainment and Warner Bros. Digital Networks, both divisions of WarnerMedia. Launched on September 15, 2018, the service featured a streaming library of animated series and films based on DC Comics properties, new original television series adapted from DC properties, as well as a rotating back catalogue of DC Comics publications, and online community features. In 2020, the service won the Webby People's Voice Award for Media Streaming.

In June 2020, WarnerMedia began to phase out DC Universe in favor of its new flagship streaming service HBO Max, initially by offering a promotional offer via DC Universe for new subscribers. In September 2020, it was announced that DC Universe would be relaunched as DC Universe Infinite—which is solely a digital comics subscription service—on January 21, 2021, and that DC Universe's original series and future streaming productions would move to HBO Max and become Max Originals.

History and development
In April 2017, DC Universe was announced as an untitled service with original television programming, with its title revealed a year later in May. The next month, the features of the service beyond original programming were revealed, including access to older DC live-action and animated films and animated series for a select period of time, a rotating selection of comics, forum discussion space, a merchandise store, and DC encyclopedia. Sam Ades, the general manager and senior vice-president at Warner Bros. Digital Network, managed the service.

Several original series were announced and developed for DC Universe: Titans and Young Justice: Outsiders, premiered in 2018 and 2019, respectively. Harley Quinn, a half-hour animated series, premiered in 2019. A Superman prequel series titled Metropolis was announced in January 2018, focusing on Lois Lane and Lex Luthor. Two live-action series Swamp Thing and Doom Patrol were released in 2019, while Metropolis was being redeveloped. A live-action Stargirl series was released in 2020, which features additional members of the Justice Society of America. DC Daily was released in September 2018, ending in July 2020.

In May 2020, WarnerMedia launched a new streaming service, HBO Max. The following month, DC Universe subscribers became eligible for a promotional discount on HBO Max for new subscribers. At the end of July, DC Universe no longer offered the yearly subscription option for the service. In August, DC Comics publisher Jim Lee revealed that all original programming would be migrated over to HBO Max. Speaking to the community aspect of DC Universe, as well as the ability to access the backlog of comics titles, Lee said "there is always going to be a need for that" and that DC was looking at ways to transform the platform so that content would not go away.

Sibling broadcast network The CW (which has carried its "Arrowverse" dramas adapted from DC Comics characters) has also carried selected DC Universe programs, including Stargirl (which aired new episodes on The CW on a one-day delay from its release on DC Universe), and Swamp Thing (acquired for its 2020 fall schedule, amid the impact of the COVID-19 pandemic on television in the United States).

DC announced in September 2020 that the service would change its name to DC Universe Infinite and become solely a digital comics subscription service on January 21, 2021. DC Universe subscriptions would automatically transfer over to DC Universe Infinite. Young Justice seasons 1–4, Titans season 1–3, Doom Patrol seasons 1–3, the first season of Stargirl, and Harley Quinn seasons 1–3 moved to HBO Max to become Max Original series, with new DC series and "key DC classics" also being available there. Stargirl was renewed exclusively by The CW for a second season.

Availability
DC Universe launched in the U.S. on September 15, 2018, and was available on iOS, Android, Roku, Apple TV, Android TV, Amazon Fire TV, and Xbox One in addition to web and mobile web access. Each subscription to DC Universe could be used on two devices at a time. Pre-orders for the streaming service became available starting on July 19, while an early beta-version was made available to select users in August. Live-action series were produced in 4K with HDR.

DC Universe was only available in the United States. At Fan Expo Canada 2018, DC editor Dan DiDio claimed the service was being beta tested in Canada with plans to launch at an unspecified date. Meanwhile, several original shows from the service were acquired by Corus Entertainment (for broadcast on its Teletoon, Adult Swim, and Showcase cable networks), while Doom Patrol was acquired by Bell Media for its CTV Sci-Fi Channel. Titans was distributed internationally on Netflix.

Content

Original programming

BizarroTV, an anthology series, was announced in October 2019 as being in development, and had an expected release date in 2020. It was unclear if it will migrate to an HBO Max Original series when the service became DC Universe Infinite.

Films and television series
At launch, the service included the four live-action Christopher Reeve Superman films, Batman Begins and The Dark Knight, the animated television series Batman: The Animated Series, Static Shock, Young Justice, Teen Titans, Batman Beyond, Batman: The Brave and the Bold, and Justice League, the live-action television series Lois & Clark: The New Adventures of Superman and Wonder Woman, the last remastered in high-definition, and animated films including Justice League: The Flashpoint Paradox, Green Lantern: First Flight, and Wonder Woman, among others. Content was updated on a monthly basis. The service added the 1970s live-action series Shazam! in March the following year.

Accolades
DC Universe won the 2020 Webby People's Voice Award for Media Streaming in the category Web.

Notes

References

External links
 

2018 establishments in California
2021 disestablishments in California
Companies based in Burbank, California
DC Entertainment
American companies established in 2018
American companies disestablished in 2021
Internet properties established in 2018
Internet properties disestablished in 2021
Internet television streaming services
Subscription video on demand services
Defunct subscription services
Defunct video on demand services